The 2014 South American Basketball Championship for Women was the 34th edition of the tournament. Eight teams featured the competition, held in Ambato, Ecuador from August 14 – 18. Brazil won the tournament, its fifteenth consecutive title and 25th overall.

Preliminary round

Group A

Group B

Classification round

5th–8th classification

Seventh place game

Fifth place game

Final round

Semifinals

Third place game

Final

Final standings

References

External links

Official website 

2014 in women's basketball
Women
2014 in Ecuadorian women's sport
International basketball competitions hosted by Ecuador
South American Basketball Championship for Women
August 2014 sports events in South America
Ambato, Ecuador